Haiz  (stylized as HΔIZ and HAIZ) is the debut extended play (EP) by American actress and singer Hailee Steinfeld. It was released on November 13, 2015, by Republic Records. The EP was preceded by the lead single, "Love Myself", which has reached the top 40 on multiple international singles charts.

The EP received mixed to positive reviews upon release and achieved modest commercial success in North America. Critics described the record as "fun" and empowering but felt that Steinfeld lacked personality. It debuted at number 38 on the Canadian Albums Chart and number 57 on the US Billboard 200. The deluxe edition, released only in Japan, debuted at number 76 on the Oricon album chart in 2016.

Background
In 2015, Steinfeld starred as Emily Junk in the musical comedy film Pitch Perfect 2, where she debuted her musical aspirations. She also released an acoustic cover of "Flashlight", a song featured in the film and performed by English singer Jessie J on the soundtrack. A week after the film's premiere, Steinfeld announced that she had signed a recording contract with Republic Records and planned to release a single that summer. Mattman & Robin, Captain Cuts, Harvey Mason Jr., and The Futuristics were all named as producers for the forthcoming record; the former duo also co-wrote all four songs that ended up on the extended play. The title and release date for HAIZ were revealed by Billboard on November 2, 2015. It was released on November 13, 2015.

The EP was re-released on February 26, 2016 to replace the original solo version of "Rock Bottom" with the remix featuring DNCE, with this newly recorded version serving as the record's second single. On July 15, 2016, it was re-released a second time to include the new single, "Starving", as a bonus track.

Singles
"Love Myself" was released on August 7, 2015, as the lead single from HAIZ and a forthcoming full-length studio album. The song garnered media attention for its empowering message as well as suggestive lyrics that evoke masturbation. It debuted on the Billboard Pop Songs airplay chart at number 27, marking the highest debut for a solo female artist on the chart since "Torn" entered at number 26 in 1998, and eventually reached a peak position of number 15. It also peaked at number 30 on the Billboard Hot 100 and reached the top 40 on the singles charts in six other countries, including Canada, New Zealand, and Sweden.

"Rock Bottom" was released as the EP's second single on February 26, 2016, as a remix with DNCE, replacing some of Steinfeld's original singing to DNCE's lead singer Joe Jonas and singing with him. In the weeks prior to the EP's release, "Hell Nos and Headphones" was being touted as the collection's second single, but "You're Such A" was selected instead. Ultimately, neither song served as a single.

Track listing

Charts

Certifications

Release history

References

2015 debut EPs
Hailee Steinfeld albums
Albums produced by Mattman & Robin
Republic Records EPs
Albums produced by Oscar Holter